Frąckowiak is a Polish-language surname. It is a patronymic surname of Northern Poland origin  formed by the addition of the diminutive suffix "-ak" to father's surname  "Frąckow". 

Notable people with this surname include:
Elżbieta Frąckowiak, Polish electrochemical engineer
Grzegorz Bolesław Frąckowiak (1911-1943),Society of the Divine Word martyr
Halina Frąckowiak, Polish singer, songwriter, and composer <-- Notability: multiple state decorations and numerous awards-->> 
Magdalena Frąckowiak (born 1984), Polish model and jewelry designer
Marek Frąckowiak (1950-2017), Polish actor of stage and screen
Richard Frackowiak (born 1950), British neurologist and neuroscientist

References

Polish-language surnames
Patronymic surnames